The following is a list of players both past and current who appeared at least in one game for the Toronto Blue Jays American League franchise (1977–present).

Players in Bold are members of the National Baseball Hall of Fame.

Players in Italics have been honoured on the Blue Jays Level of Excellence.


A

B

C

D

E

F

G

H

I

J

K

L

M

N

O

P

Q

R

S

T

U

V

W

Y

Z

Nationality breakdown

External links
Blue Jays All-Time Players (BlueJays.com)
BR batting statistics
BR pitching statistics

Major League Baseball all-time rosters
Roster